German submarine U-529 was a Type IXC/40 U-boat of Nazi Germany's Kriegsmarine, built for service during World War II. The submarine was laid down on 26 November 1941 at the Deutsche Werft yard in Hamburg as yard number 344, launched on 15 July 1942, and commissioned on 30 September 1942 under the command of Kapitänleutnant Georg-Werner Fraatz. After training with the 4th U-boat Flotilla, U-529 was transferred to the 10th flotilla for front-line service on 1 February 1943.

Design
German Type IXC/40 submarines were slightly larger than the original Type IXCs. U-529 had a displacement of  when at the surface and  while submerged. She had two shafts and two  propellers.

U-529 was fitted with six  torpedo tubes (four fitted at the bow and two at the stern), 22 torpedoes, one  SK C/32 naval gun, 180 rounds, and a  SK C/30 as well as a  C/30 anti-aircraft gun. The boat had a complement of forty-eight.

Service history

U-529 sailed from Kiel on her first and only war patrol on 30 January 1943. The U-boat was sunk with all hands on 15 February 1943 in the North Atlantic, in position , by depth charges from a British B-24 Liberator aircraft from No. 201 Squadron RAF. She was originally listed as missing, assumed lost at sea, as the Liberator attack of 15 February was believed to have sunk .

That was the assumption until 1985; the opening of the British Archives clarified that this attack had been made on another U-boat which had survived. The Loss of U-529 was thus a diving accident and it cannot clearly be said where the boat lies.

Wolfpacks
U-529 took part in one wolfpack, namely:
 Ritter (11 – 12 February 1943)

References

Bibliography

External links

World War II submarines of Germany
German Type IX submarines
1942 ships
U-boats commissioned in 1942
U-boats sunk by depth charges
U-boats sunk by British aircraft
Ships built in Hamburg
U-boats sunk in 1943
Maritime incidents in February 1943